Fractured Land is a 2015 Canadian feature documentary film directed by Fiona Rayher and Damien Gillis, profiling the Dené activist Caleb Behn as he goes through law school and builds a movement around greater awareness of hydraulic fracturing (fracking) on First Nations lands.

Production 
The film was in a crowd-source funding drive as of early 2013.

Release 
The film had its world premiere on 28 April 2015 at the Hot Docs Canadian International Documentary Festival.

Awards 
At the 2015 Hot Docs Canadian International Documentary Festival, the film finished 7th in the audience balloting.

At the 2015 Vancouver International Film Festival, the BC Spotlight jury awarded Fractured Land the award for Best BC Film, and the film won the VIFF Impact: Canadian Audience Award.

See also
Hydraulic fracturing in Canada

References

External links 

 
 
 Official Facebook
 Documentary Channel (from CBC.ca)

2015 films
2015 documentary films
Crowdfunded films
Canadian documentary films
English-language Canadian films
Films shot in British Columbia
Documentary films about hydraulic fracturing
Documentary films about indigenous rights
Documentary films about First Nations
Documentary films about lawyers
2010s Canadian films